Anthony Bertolacci (1776-1833) was the 6th Civil Auditor General of British Ceylon. 

A Corsican, he left Corsica with his British employers when they evacuated the island in 1796 after a short military occupation. Around 1799 he followed his patron, the Hon. Frederick North, to Ceylon as his secretary, but soon became firstly Postmaster-General and later Comptroller-General of Customs.

He became acting Civil Auditor General on 30 January 1811, succeeding Richard Plasket, and held the office until 1 September 1814, when he was succeeded by John D'Oyly.

References

1776 births
1833 deaths
Auditors General of Sri Lanka
British colonial governors and administrators in Asia